Willi Sturm (28 January 1928 – 5 August 1993) was a German water polo player. He competed at the 1952 Summer Olympics and the 1956 Summer Olympics.

References

1928 births
1993 deaths
German male water polo players
Olympic water polo players of Germany
Olympic water polo players of the United Team of Germany
Water polo players at the 1952 Summer Olympics
Water polo players at the 1956 Summer Olympics
Place of birth missing